Ahmed Gaafar (Arabic: أحمد جعفر; born December 21, 1985) is an Egyptian footballer. He plays as a center forward for Zamalek

Career
In 2008–09 Egyptian Premier League season, Gaafar scored 11 goals for Itesalat making him the top goal scorer of his team. However, those goals were not enough to save Itesalat from relegation to the second division that season. As a result, he transferred to Zamalek before the beginning of the 2009/2010 season. In season 2009/2010 he scored 9 goals beginning his first season with zamalek. Even with the return of Amr Zaki from his loan move from Hull City A.F.C., and the arrival of 3 strikers: Ivorian Abou Kone, Iraqi Emad Mohammed, and Algerian Mohamed Amine Aoudia in the 2010/2011 season, Gaafar remained the first choice striker for Zamalek under the coaching of Hossam Hassan. In that season, Gaafar was among the league's top scorers finishing with 11 goals making him the second top scorer for Zamalek that season with 11 goals, where Shikabala had finished first in Zamalek with 13. On April 23, 2012, Gaafar revealed that Turkish Besiktas and Belgian Anderlecht and several other European clubs were interested in his services and looking to acquire him in the 2012 summer transfer window.

Honors
Zamalek SC
Egypt Cup (3): 2013, 2014, 2016
Egyptian Super Cup: 2016

Individual
Egypt Cup Top Goalscorer: 2013 (5 goals)

References

1985 births
Living people
Egyptian footballers
Zamalek SC players
ENPPI SC players
Petrojet SC players
Egyptian Premier League players
Association football forwards
People from Monufia Governorate